Ruletero a toda marcha ("Taxi Driver in Full Swing") is a 1962 Mexican film. It stars Eulalio González, María Duval, Norma Angélica Ladrón de Guevara, and Sara García.

External links
 

1962 films
Mexican adventure comedy-drama films
1960s Spanish-language films
1960s Mexican films